Snow Pink is the second extended play by South Korean girl group Apink. It was released on November 21, 2011, with the lead single "My My" used to promote the EP.

Background and release

Snow Pink was released three months after Apink's debut EP, Seven Springs of Apink. The main producers for the album were Shinsadong Tiger, Super Changttai and Rado.

Singles

The lead single from the album was "My My" which was composed by Shinsadong Tiger and Rado. Promotions for the song began on November 25, on KBS' Music Bank. The song peaked at number 16 on Gaon's digital chart and Billboard's K-Pop Hot 100. A Japanese version of the song was later included on the group's Japanese single, "NoNoNo", released October 22, 2014.

Track listing

Charts

Sales and certifications

References

Apink albums
2011 EPs
Dance-pop EPs
Korean-language EPs
Cube Entertainment EPs